Patiphat Chalardchaleam (born 9 July 1987) is a Thai badminton player.

Achievements

Southeast Asian Games 
Men's doubles

BWF International Challenge/Series (7 titles, 2 runners-up) 
Men's doubles

Mixed doubles

  BWF International Challenge tournament
  BWF International Series tournament

References

External links 
 

Patiphat Chalardchaleam
Living people
1987 births
Badminton players at the 2014 Asian Games
Patiphat Chalardchaleam
Competitors at the 2009 Southeast Asian Games
Competitors at the 2011 Southeast Asian Games
Patiphat Chalardchaleam
Southeast Asian Games medalists in badminton
Patiphat Chalardchaleam